Blackhouse is a Christian industrial band based in Eureka, California. Blackhouse plays what has been cited as "primo industrial rock", contrasting with industrial rock styles promulgated by artists such as NIN, Klank, or Circle of Dust. Blackhouse was formed in 1984 and is cited as the first band to make industrial music for the Christian market.

Background
Musically acclaimed and sometimes cited as being a founding band of the entire genre, Blackhouse has ensued for over three decades, and the band has produced a myriad of releases in that time. Often the band finds itself riding the fine line between artistic expression and forming a message in a way that could be accepted in the broad Christian community. One album featured a cover showing a rabbit crucified, with the thought of exposing the real meaning of Easter.

The sound that Blackhouse offered was far outside the norms of Christian music at the time of the band's formation, and live performances met with resistance from both the Christian right and Neo-Nazi youth organizations. The Neo-Nazi groups protested the religious content, which was unusual in a genre more known for espousing negative themes including nihilism, pornography, sadomasochism, and drug culture, and the Christians took point with the style that the band offered, again due to its association with negative elements of society. After a time the band went underground, focusing on producing recorded material rather than touring.

Their music continues to be on the cutting edge of creativity and experimental, avant-garde music. One review of their 2006 collaborative project Beetu Lathri Kwan found that their genre-mixing produced what was deemed an "intentional dissolution of traditional concepts of... music." The music's effect on the reviewers has shown a great variety of responses. One reviewer reported that the sound finds the "border of our conscious and unconscious thinking", while others have insisted that the sound is "barely good for background noise" or "more frustrating than enjoyable". Lyrics are generally noted as being few and far between, but containing positive messages and espousing Christian faith.

Discography

Studio albums
Pro-Life (1984)
Hope Like A Candle (1985)
Five Minutes After I Die (1986)
Holy War (1987)
We Will Fight Back! (1988)
Stairway To Heaven (1989)
The Father, The Son, And The Holy Ghost (1990)
Material World (1990)
Hidden Beneath The Metal (1991)
Stairway To A Gospel World (1994)
Shock The Nation! (1995)
Shades Of Black (1998)
Lawnmowerman (1998)
Sex Sex Sex (1999)
Dreams Like These (2000)
Heart Of Black (2002)
Yuen (2015)
Ignite Blackhouse Youth (2016)
X Communicator (2023)

Compilation albums
Dribbles (2005)
25th Years Anniversary + Hope (2010)
Beyond The Gates Of Good & Evil (2012)
One Man's Collection (2019)

Video albums
Thirty In 30 (2012)

Split albums
Ice Skin / The Gospel According To The Men In Black (1991, split with Nightmare Lodge)
Comin' On Strong (2011, split with Hypnoskull)
Sacrificium Messiae (2016, split with Maurizio Bianchi)

Singles
"Reason For The Season" 7" (1997)
"y2k / Millennium" 7" (1999)
"Material World" Video CD-R (2005)
"Robots" 7" Picture Disc (2018)

Members
Brian Ladd is the sole permanent member of Blackhouse. Early releases were credited to Ivo Cutler and Sterling Cross. Ladd has explained this was because "I always thought of Blackhouse as being SUPERMAN and I was merely a Clark Kent"

References

External links
Official site
Cross Rhythms artist Profile
LADD-FRITH Music
Discogs page

American industrial music groups
Power electronics (music)